Nicolás Javier Cardona Ruiz (born February 11, 1999) is a Puerto Rican footballer who currently plays as a defender for Chattanooga Red Wolves in the USL League One.

International career
Cardona made his international debut for Puerto Rico in a 1–0 win over the Dominican Republic. He had previously played in friendlies with the team including a match against his future club, Hartford Athletic in 2019. On June 1, 2021, Cardona was named as captain for Puerto Rico in the team's 7–0 win over the Bahamas during 2022 FIFA World Cup qualifiers.

Club career
Cardona signed with USL Championship team Hartford Athletic on February 22, 2021. He had previously spent time with the U23 team of Spanish club UB Conquense. Cardona scored his first professional goal on June 19, 2021 when he scored the go ahead goal in Hartford's 2-1 win over Loudoun United in the 94th minute.

On February 22, 2022, Cardona signed with USL League One club Chattanooga Red Wolves.

Career statistics

Club

Notes

International

References

External links
 Nicolás Cardona at the Assumption University

1999 births
Living people
Puerto Rican footballers
Puerto Rican expatriate footballers
Puerto Rico international footballers
Association football defenders
People from San Juan, Puerto Rico
Puerto Rican expatriate sportspeople in Spain
Expatriate footballers in Spain
Assumption Greyhounds men's soccer players
Hartford Athletic players
Chattanooga Red Wolves SC players
USL League One players
USL Championship players